Mary Ella Dees (June 3, 1911 – August 4, 2005) was an American stage and screen actress who once served as a primary stand-in double for actress Jean Harlow.

Biography and career
Born in Syracuse, New York on June 3, 1911, the daughter of a successful lawyer, Dees was for a time raised in Tuscaloosa, Alabama. She worked for a short time as a typist before moving to Hollywood in 1932. She was named Miss America in Hollywood in 1932, an accomplishment that led director Jack Conway to give her a bit part in Red Headed Woman. That film starred Jean Harlow, who befriended Dees. She advised the newcomer to study dancing, helped her to shop for "the right clothes" and helped to pay for Dees's gowns.

Dees was a dancer when, in 1937, after the sudden death of Harlow, she was cast by MGM boss Louis B. Mayer as a four-minute stand-in for the star, who was acting opposite Clark Gable on the film Saratoga, which was still in production.

Dees had parts in The Last Gangster (1937), The Women (1939), as well as a number of Three Stooges shorts, which included Hoi Polloi (1935), and numerous Marx Brothers comedies.

Later career
Dees appeared in her last film role in 1946, in the Marx Brothers film A Night in Casablanca. She continued to act on stage in repertory theatre until 1985.

Death
Dees died on August 4, 2005 in Lake Worth, Florida, aged 94, after a long illness.

Filmography

References

External links

1911 births
2005 deaths
American film actresses
American stage actresses
Actresses from Syracuse, New York
People from Lake Worth Beach, Florida
People from Tuscaloosa, Alabama
20th-century American actresses
21st-century American women